Roger David Alcocer García (born 18 June 1966) is a Mexican politician affiliated with the Institutional Revolutionary Party. As of 2014 he served as Deputy of the LIX Legislature of the Mexican Congress representing Yucatán.

References

1966 births
Living people
Politicians from Yucatán (state)
Members of the Chamber of Deputies (Mexico) for Yucatán
Institutional Revolutionary Party politicians
Members of the Congress of Yucatán
Municipal presidents in Yucatán (state)
People from Valladolid, Yucatán
Instituto Tecnológico de Mérida alumni
Deputies of the LIX Legislature of Mexico